Yaroslav Potapov (born 1 July 1999) is a Russian swimmer. He competed in the men's 1500 metre freestyle event at the 2016 Summer Olympics.

References

External links
 

1999 births
Living people
Russian male swimmers
Olympic swimmers of Russia
Swimmers at the 2016 Summer Olympics
Place of birth missing (living people)
Russian male freestyle swimmers